= Sycamore Service Corps =

Sycamore Service Corps is a local program of AmeriCorps in Terre Haute, Indiana. It is sponsored by the Center for Public Service and Community Engagement at Indiana State University. Sycamore Service Corps provide service to local non-profit organizations.

== Activities ==
Sycamore Service Corps members work on community needs in education, public safety, human services, and the environment. For example, Sycamore Service Corps members might:

- Tutor teens and teach elementary school students
- Work in food pantry/food drive
- Assist families in locating parenting and child care resources
- Provide one-on-one mentoring
- Lead youth programs and activities
- Teach adults basic life skills
- Help unemployed or underemployed adults with job skills

AmeriCorps members are U.S. Citizens, nationals, or lawful permanent residents of the U.S. and at least 18 years of age.
